Yogeshwar is an Indian masculine given name. It has the meanings "master in magical arts", "master in yoga", "deity", and has been used as an epithet for Krishna, Vetala, Yajnavalkya, and others. A South Indian analogue of this name is Yogeswaran.

Notable people 
 C. P. Yogeshwar (born 1962), Indian politician from Karnataka
 Ranga Yogeshwar (born 1959), Luxembourgish physicist and science journalist
 Yogeshwar Amatya (born 1964), Nepali singer, musician, producer, actor, social activist, and photographer
 Yogeshwar Dayal (1930–1994), Indian judge 
 Yogeshwar Dutt (born 1982), Indian freestyle wrestler
 Yogeshwar Prasad Yogesh (?–2007), Indian politician from Uttar Pradesh/Uttarakhand
 Yogeshwar Raj Singh (born 1967), scion of Kawardha Raj family

References 

Indian masculine given names